Side Show  is a 1931 American pre-Code musical comedy drama film directed by Roy Del Ruth and starring Winnie Lightner, Charles Butterworth, Evalyn Knapp and Donald Cook. It was produced and released by Warner Bros. The film was based on a story by William K. Wells. Although it was planned and filmed as a full-scale musical, most of the songs were cut from the film before release due to the public tiring of musicals.

Plot
Pat (Winnie Lightner) does everything she can to keep the struggling Colonel Gowdy Big City Shows traveling circus afloat, despite an alcoholic though well-meaning Colonel Gowdy (Guy Kibbee) and disgruntled unpaid workers. She sings and dances, and even does a high dive into a shallow pool of water when the "Great Santini" quits just before a performance. One of her few comforts is her love for barker Joe Palmer (Donald Cook). He, however, seems less enthused about the relationship and regularly takes money from her. To add to her troubles, her younger sister Irene (Evalyn Knapp), whom she is having educated to become a lady, visits her during school vacation and wants to stay with the circus.

Irene and Tom fall in love. When Pat finds out, she sends Irene back to school, fires Tom, and tells Gowdy she is quitting the circus. Tom and Irene come to their senses, and Tom asks Pat to marry him.

Cast
Winnie Lightner as Pat. (The film's director, Roy Del Ruth, later fell in love with Lightner and married her in 1934.)
Charles Butterworth as Sidney, a circus worker who loves Pat and keeps spouting odd, illogical sentences
Evalyn Knapp as Irene
Donald Cook as Joe Palmer
Guy Kibbee as Pop "Colonel" Gowdy
Matthew Betz as Tom Whalen
Fred Kelsey as Sheriff Hornsby
Tom Ricketts as Tom Allison
Vince Barnett as "The Great Santini" (uncredited)

Production
The film was originally intended to be released in the United States early in 1931, but was shelved due to public apathy towards musicals. After waiting a number of months for public tastes to change, Warner Bros. reluctantly released the film in September 1931 after removing all but one song, "She Came from a South Sea Isle", sung by Lightner. The film was released outside the United States (where there was no aversion to musicals) as a full musical comedy early in 1931.

Reception
Mordaunt Hall, critic for The New York Times, gave the film a generally unfavorable review, writing, "What little there is in the way of entertainment in 'Side Show,' the picture now at the Strand, is delivered by Charles Butterworth, but even this clever comedian is handicapped by the hardy efforts of others to arouse laughter." He also noted that Kibbee "does his best to make this film diverting", but "Miss Lightner can scarcely be congratulated on her performance."

Preservation
Only the cut print released in 1931 in the United States is known to have survived.

References

External links
 
 

1931 films
1931 musical comedy films
American black-and-white films
American musical comedy films
Circus films
1930s English-language films
American films based on plays
Films directed by Roy Del Ruth
Warner Bros. films
1930s American films